Sick Transit Gloria Mundi is the sixth album by the industrial metal band Red Harvest. The album was released in 2002. The album was nominated for a Norwegian Grammy and an alternative Grammy in the "Best Metal Album" category.

Track listing

References

External links
 Red Harvest's official website

2002 albums
Red Harvest (band) albums